Martin Smedberg-Dalence (born 10 May 1984) is a former professional footballer who played as a right midfielder. Born in Sweden, he represented the Bolivia national team between 2014 and 2016, winning 13 caps and scoring one goal.

International career
Dalence has represented Sweden at youth levels. In 2013, he said his dream is to play for the Bolivian senior team.

On 3 October 2014 he officially received his first call-up to the Bolivia national football team.

Dalence was included in the Bolivian squad for the 2015 Copa América in Chile by manager Mauricio Soria. On 15 June, he scored his first international goal in the team's second group match – a 3–2 defeat of Ecuador – to give El Verde its first win at the Copa América since the 1997 tournament.

Personal life
Although born in Norrköping, his family moved to Gothenburg when he was very young and he was subsequently raised there. His father, Ramiro Dalence, is from Oruro, Bolivia, and came to Sweden in 1980, where he also became a DJ at Folkets Hus in Hammarkullen 424, Angered. He revealed in an interview in 2013 that he is a fan of Real Madrid, and, like his father, The Strongest.

Career statistics

Club

International

International goals

Scores and results list Bolivia's goal tally first

Honours
;IFK Göteborg
 Svenska Cupen: 2014–15
Individual
Archangel of the Year: 2016

References

External links
IFK Göteborg profile

1984 births
Living people
Sportspeople from Norrköping
Swedish people of Bolivian descent
People with acquired Bolivian citizenship
Swedish footballers
Sweden youth international footballers
Bolivian footballers
Bolivia international footballers
Allsvenskan players
Superettan players
Division 2 (Swedish football) players
Bolivian Primera División players
IFK Göteborg players
Västra Frölunda IF players
Ljungskile SK players
IFK Norrköping players
Club Bolívar players
Club Always Ready players
Utsiktens BK players
2015 Copa América players
Association football midfielders
Footballers from Östergötland County